John Brandreth was an Irish dean in the middle of the 18th century.

A former Archdeacon of Killaloe and Dean of Armagh (1731–1736), Brandreth was Dean of Emly from 1736 until 1765.

References

Irish Anglicans
Deans of Armagh
Deans of Emly
Archdeacons of Killaloe